Dysdera erythrina is a species of spider in the family Dysderidae. It is nearly indistinguishable from the spider Dysdera crocata, but is far less common and has a much smaller geographic range. Like its relative D. crocata, this spider uses its disproportionately huge chelicerae to kill woodlice, as well as silverfish, earwigs, millipedes, beetles, and even centipedes.

Distribution
The species is commonly found in the south of Great Britain. It is also found in Western and Central Europe.

References

External links
 https://www.itis.gov/servlet/SingleRpt/SingleRpt?search_topic=TSN&search_value=855494

Dysderidae
Spiders of Europe
Spiders described in 1802